The 1999 Barangay Ginebra Kings season was the 21st season of the franchise in the Philippine Basketball Association (PBA).

Draft pick

New Era
In December of last year, Senator Robert Jaworski, Sr. announced his resignation with the Ginebra ballclub during a press conference, bidding goodbye to the team and the sport that has been part of his illustrious career and made him a certified icon for the past 15 years. As the PBA enters its 25th season, a New Era has come for the never-say-die team now known as Barangay Ginebra Kings.

Occurrences
Allan Caidic, who was assigned as player-assistant coach of Ginebra at the start of the season, began his role as playing-coach for the team starting the Governors Cup, replacing coach Rino Salazar. The Kings has yet to score a victory in five games when they decided to replace import Mario Donaldson in favor of Monty Lamont Wilson.

Notable dates
March 12: The Gin Kings stopped Alaska's winning run with a 97–87 victory and maintain their winning streak to three after losing their first four games in the season.

May 5: Barangay Ginebra defeated Sta.Lucia Realtors, 77–74, in their playoff game for the 8th and last entry to the quarterfinal round.

May 12: Point guard Bal David converted a buzzer-beating shot from an inbound with three seconds left as Barangay Ginebra Kings pulled a stunning 82–81 upset win over top-seeded Mobiline Phone Pals in the do-or-die quarterfinals match. The Kings with a twice-to-beat disadvantage, forces a playoff three nights ago and repeated over the heavily favored Phone Pals. Barangay Ginebra will go up against Formula Shell in the best-of-five semifinal series of the All-Filipino Cup.

November 7: Barangay Ginebra defeated Pop Cola, 80–76, in a battle of winless teams to end a seven-game slump and give Allan Caidic his first win as playing-coach.

Roster

Transactions

Off-season trades

Additions

Mid-season trade

Recruited imports

References

Barangay Ginebra San Miguel seasons
Barangay